Battle of Sutjeska (also known as The Fifth Offensive) is a 1973 Yugoslav partisan film directed by Stipe Delić. It tells the story of the famous Battle of Sutjeska, the greatest engagement of the Yugoslav Partisan War. The film is one of the most expensive ever made in Yugoslavia. It was selected as the Yugoslav entry for the Best Foreign Language Film at the 46th Academy Awards, but was not accepted as a nominee. It was also entered into the 8th Moscow International Film Festival where it won a Special Prize.

Plot
German-occupied Bosnia and Herzegovina, 1943; under the faithful leadership of Marshal Tito, the Yugoslav Partisans have, for a number of years, put up a staunch fight against the occupying Axis powers. Despite being out-gunned, outmaneuvered and vastly outnumbered, they managed to recuperate in a harsh mountainous region called Durmitor in northern Montenegro. However, their respite is short-lived as the combined foreign and domestic Axis powers begin an encirclement offensive, outnumbering them 6:1. The Partisans have no choice but to fight their way out of the encirclement, then head towards eastern Bosnia. They finally clash with the Axis on the plains of Sutjeska in south-eastern Bosnia.

Various people are caught up in the fighting, such as a Dalmatian who lost all of his children during the war. As the fighting intensifies, the story and the scenes are drawn more and more into the colossal battle as both sides are forced into a conflict that can only be described as a living hell. Battle scenes are interlaced with the personal agonies and fates of the main characters, from supreme commanders to ordinary soldiers.

The offensive ends in failure for the Axis, but the Partisans are in no mood to celebrate — they have suffered devastating losses. Still, on they march.

Cast
 Richard Burton as Josip Broz Tito
 Ljuba Tadić as Sava Kovačević
 Bata Živojinović as Nikola
 Miroljub Lešo as Boro
 Irene Papas as Boro's Mother
 Milena Dravić as Vera
 Bert Sotlar as Barba
 Boris Dvornik as Ivan
 Rade Marković as Radoš
 Ljubiša Samardžić as Stanojlo 
 Milan Puzić as Member of the Partisan Headquarters
 Kole Angelovski as Stanojlo's Friend
 Stole Aranđelović as The Priest
 Relja Bašić as Capt. Stewart
 Branko Špoljar as Member of the General Staff
 Petar Banićević as Capt. William Deakin
 Günter Meisner as Gen. Rudolf Lüters
 Anton Diffring as Gen. Alexander Löhr
 Michael Cramer as Col. Wagner
 Orson Welles as Winston Churchill

See also
 List of submissions to the 46th Academy Awards for Best Foreign Language Film
 List of Yugoslav submissions for the Academy Award for Best Foreign Language Film

References

External links 

1973 films
Films set in 1943
Yugoslav war films
Partisan films
War films set in Partisan Yugoslavia
World War II films based on actual events
Films set in Bosnia and Herzegovina
Serbo-Croatian-language films
1970s English-language films
English-language Yugoslav films
Films directed by Stipe Delić
Films with screenplays by Ugo Pirro
Films scored by Mikis Theodorakis
Films with screenplays by Wolf Mankowitz
Films about Josip Broz Tito
Yugoslav World War II films
1973 war films
Films about Yugoslav Resistance